Charles Richmond Mitchell (November 30, 1872 – August 16, 1942) was a Canadian lawyer, judge, cabinet minister and former Leader of the Official Opposition in the Legislative Assembly of Alberta.

Early life
Mitchell was born in Newcastle, New Brunswick. At the time, the Mitchells were a prominent local family: Mitchell's father was the Sheriff of Northumberland County and his uncle was Peter Mitchell, a senator and later Premier of New Brunswick.

He went to the University of New Brunswick and King's College and took the New Brunswick bar exam in 1897. The next year he moved to Medicine Hat, at that time in the Northwest Territories and opened a thriving legal practice. He was appointed as a Judge in 1907 for the Calgary District Court.

Cabinet minister

Mitchell was first elected in a by-election in Medicine Hat provincial electoral district on June 29, 1910, after he had been appointed to the cabinet by Premier Arthur Lewis Sifton on June 1, 1910.

Mitchell served two cabinet portfolios as the Minister of Education and the Attorney General of the province. He would serve both portfolios for 2 years until he became Minister of Public Works on May 4, 1912, and dropped the others. In the 1913 Alberta general election Mitchell was defeated by Nelson Spencer from the Conservative Party. Mitchell was the only Cabinet minister defeated that election, but that was one of a number of high-profile defeats across the province.

After his defeat in the 1913 general election, George Lane, the Member for Bow Valley, resigned to provide a seat for the defeated Minister. On June 12, 1913, he was acclaimed and once again rejoined the government. He would serve Bow Valley as its Member until his resignation in 1926.

Mitchell was reappointed Cabinet as the Provincial Treasurer on November 28, 1913.  He became the first non-premier Treasurer in Alberta history. He held that position until the government was defeated in 1921.

On April 29, 1920, Mitchell was appointed to be Minister of Municipal Affairs, in addition to being the Treasurer.

Defeat of government
Mitchell was one of the few Liberal Party members to survive the defeat of the government in 1921. After the resignation of John R. Boyle to the judiciary on October 27, 1924, Mitchell became the fifth leader of the Liberal Party of Alberta. He would serve as Leader of the Official opposition until he was appointed in 1926 as a Justice to the Supreme Court of Alberta Appellate Division, when he vacated his seat and position as Liberal leader.

He retired from the judiciary in 1936.

Death
Mitchell died in 1942 in Edmonton, Alberta.

Electoral record

1910 by-election

1913 general election

Notes

References
 

1872 births
1942 deaths
Calgary city councillors
Judges in Alberta
Lawyers in Alberta
Leaders of the Alberta Liberal Party
People from Medicine Hat
People from Miramichi, New Brunswick
University of New Brunswick alumni
Members of the Executive Council of Alberta
University of New Brunswick Faculty of Law alumni
Alberta Liberal Party MLAs